Although the roles, livelihoods, and safety of women in Tanzania have improved significantly since the 20th century, the nation remains a strongly patriarchal society in which women face high rates of gendered violence and barriers to full legal rights and education.

Legal rights and parliamentary representation 
The nation's 1977 constitution guarantees women equal protection under the law and prohibits discrimination based on gender. 

The 1971 Law of Marriage Act set the legal age for marriage at 15 for girls and 18 for boys. In 2016, a case to raise the legal age for girls to 18 was petitioned by Rebeca Gyumi, the founder and executive director of the msichana initiative, a non-governmental organisation that advocates for the rights of women and girls and the right to education. The high court directed the Tanzanian government to raise the legal age to 18 for girls and to align the legal age for both genders. This decision was appealed by the Tanzanian government but in 2019 the court upheld its prior ruling. Tanzania does not maintain official statistics on child marriage, but human rights organizations estimate that Tanzania still has one of the highest rates of child marriages worldwide. 

The Tanzanian Sexual Offences Special Provisions Act explicitly excludes marital rape as a criminal offence. 

In 1985, Tanzania was one of the first countries to establish a women's quota for parliament and the number of reserved-seats and female members of parliament has steadily increased since. Female members of parliament are elected indirectly: political parties provide a list with their female candidates to the Electoral Commission before the elections and the distribution of the reserved-seats is carried out proportionally between all parties that gain more than 5% of the popular vote.This quota-system was not intended to be established permanently and female politicians can switch from a reserved-seat to a constituency seat in subsequent elections. In all the past elections however, the number of women gaining a constituency seat has been significantly lower than the number of women who gained a reserved-seat.

Since 19 March 2021, Samia Suluhu Hassan is the first female President of Tanzania.

See also 
Human rights in Tanzania

References